is Beni's eight single under the label Nayutawave Records. The song "Yurayura" is about the "wavering feelings you have after a break and how you want to move on", the song is supposed to be the new signature song. "Gimme Gimme" is the new Kao Biore Body Deli commercial song and is about "confessing your feelings to the one you love".

Track list

Charts

*Chart position for "Gimme Gimme."

Reported sales

References

2010 singles
Beni (singer) songs
Songs with lyrics by Shoko Fujibayashi
2010 songs